Linhas Aéreas Paulistas (LAP) was a Brazilian airline founded in 1943. In 1951 it was bought and merged into Lóide Aéreo Nacional.

History
Linhas Aéreas Paulistas (LAP) S.A. was founded in 1943 but the first meeting of shareholders took place only on February 9, 1945. In June 1945 LAP was given authorization to operate and in 1946 flights from São Paulo to Recife via the coast started. Later, flights were extended beyond Recife, to Campina Grande. 
 
In February 1947 LAP started to operate also between São Paulo-Congonhas and Rio de Janeiro-Santos Dumont. In 1948 services were extended to Fortaleza and Natal. In 1951 Lóide Aéreo Nacional bought the airline.

Destinations

In 1946 LAP served the following cities:

Fleet

Accidents and incidents
12 July 1951: a Douglas DC-3/C-47 registration PP-LPG, operating a flight for Lóide Aéreo Nacional but still registered under LAP, flying from Maceió to Aracaju, after aborting a landing in adverse conditions in Aracaju, overflew the runway and initiated a turn in low altitude to the right. The aircraft crashed during this turn. All 33 passengers and crew died, including the Governor of the state of Rio Grande do Norte Jerônimo Dix-sept Rosado Maia, causing this accident to be the 2nd deadliest accident in Brazil at the time.

See also
List of defunct airlines of Brazil

References

External links
LAP Accidents as per Aviation Safety Database

Defunct airlines of Brazil
Airlines established in 1943
Airlines disestablished in 1951
1943 establishments in Brazil
1951 disestablishments in Brazil
1951 mergers and acquisitions